Al Taylor (August 8, 1887 – March 2, 1951) was an American character actor during the silent and sound film eras.

Biography
Born in Boston in 1887, Taylor began in films with a small role in the 1926 silent film, The Fighting Cheat, starring Wally Wales and Jean Arthur. During his career he appeared in over 200 films, mostly in small, uncredited roles. The vast majority of his roles were in Westerns, such as The Lawless Nineties (1936), starring John Wayne, 1940's Heroes of the Saddle, a The Three Mesquiteers' film, and the 1942 Roy Rogers film, Man from Cheyenne.

Filmography
(Per AFI database)

 The Fighting Cheat (1926) ... Cook 
 The Bandit Buster (1926) ... Hotel clerk
 The Bonanza Buckaroo (1926) ... Carney
 The Dangerous Dub (1926) ... Scar-Face Hanan
 Rawhide (1926) ... Jim Reep
 The Ramblin' Galoot (1926)
 Soda Water Cowboy (1927) ... Joe
 The Interferin' Gent (1927) ... Ben Douglas
 Between Dangers (1927) ... Charlie
 The Ballyhoo Buster (1928)
 Desperate Courage (1928)
 The Utah Kid (1930)
 Quick Trigger Lee (1931) ... Red
 The Avenger (1931)
 The Range Feud (1931)
 The Fighting Fool (1932)
 Come On, Tarzan (1932)
 The Saddle Buster (1932) ... Blackie
 Ghost Valley (1932) ... Henchman
 Law and Lawless (1932) 
 Unknown Valley (1933)
 Little Man, What Now? (1934) ... Cashier
 Westward Ho (1935)
 The Lawless Nineties (1936) ... Red
 Guns and Guitars (1936)
 The Cattle Thief (1936)
 Ranger Courage (1936)
 Rio Grande Ranger (1936)
 Roarin' Guns (1936)
 The Traitor (1936)
 The Unknown Ranger (1936)
 Come On, Cowboys (1937)
 Billy the Kid Returns (1938)
 Call the Mesquiteers (1938)
 Gold Mine in the Sky (1938)
 The Man from Music Mountain (1938) ... Hank
 Prairie Moon (1938)
 The Lone Ranger Rides Again (1939)
 Mexicali Rose (1939)
 Mountain Rhythm (1939)
 Wyoming Outlaw (1939)
 The Carson City Kid (1940)
 Covered Wagon Days (1940)
 Dark Command (1940)
 Ghost Valley Raiders (1940)
 Heroes of the Saddle (1940) ... Hendericks
 Mysterious Doctor Satan (1940)
 Oklahoma Renegades (1940)
 Gangs of Sonora (1941)
 Jesse James at Bay (1941) ... Frank James
 Outlaws of Cherokee Trail (1941)
 Robin Hood of the Pecos (1941)
 Sheriff of Tombstone (1941)
 Two Gun Sheriff (1941)
 Call of the Canyon (1942) ... Rancher
 The Cyclone Kid (1942)
 Man from Cheyenne (1942) ... Ranch hand
 Outlaws of Pine Ridge (1942) ... Roberts
 The Phantom Plainsmen (1942) ... Heavy
 Code of the Outlaw (1942) ... Joe
 Prairie Pals (1942)
 Raiders of the Range (1942) ... Jensen
 Sheriff of Sage Valley (1942)
 Stagecoach Express (1942)
 The Yukon Patrol (1942)
 Beyond the Last Frontier (1943)
 Black Hills Express (1943)
 The Blocked Trail (1943)
 Westward Ho (1942) ... Hank
 Calling Wild Bill Elliott (1943) ... Guard
 Death Valley Manhunt (1943) ... Lawson
 The Black Hills Express (1943) ... Denver
 Dead Man's Gulch (1943) ... Buck Lathrop
 The Man from Thunder River (1943) ... Deputy
 Raiders of Sunset Pass (1943)
 Santa Fe Scouts (1943) ... Curt
 Thundering Trails (1943)
 Wolves of the Range (1943)
 Marshal of Reno (1944) ... Brown
 Stagecoach to Monterey'' (1944)

References

External links
 
 

1887 births
1951 deaths
20th-century American male actors
American male silent film actors